The men's 1 km time trial at the 1986 Commonwealth Games, was part of the cycling programme, which took place in July 1986.

Results

References

Men's 1 km time trial
Cycling at the Commonwealth Games – Men's 1 km time trial